Athis superba is a moth in the Castniidae family. It is found in Peru and French Guiana.

Subspecies
Athis superba superba (Peru)
Athis superba orientalis (Lathy, 1922) (French Guiana)

References

Moths described in 1912
Castniidae
Moths of South America